Ili Setefano Taateo Tafili is a Samoan politician and matai. He is a member of the Tautua Samoa Party.

He was first elected to the Legislative Assembly of Samoa at the 2016 election, defeating Minister of Women's Affairs Tolofuaivalelei Falemoe Leiataua to win the constituency of Aana Alofi No. 2, becoming one of only three Tautua MP's.

In April 2020 he revealed that he was facing pressure from his constituents to switch his support to the Human Rights Protection Party (HRPP). He ran as an independent in the April 2021 election and was defeated. A subsequent electoral petition saw him convicted of two counts of bribery.

References

Year of birth missing (living people)
Living people
Members of the Legislative Assembly of Samoa
Samoan chiefs
Tautua Samoa Party politicians
Human Rights Protection Party politicians